Jan Holub (born August 7, 1991) is a Czech speedway rider who ride for Kolejarz Opole in the Polish Second League.

Personal life 
Jan comes from a 3-generation speedway family; his grandfather (Jan I) and father (Jan II) also were speedway riders with high records. Jan I has finished sixth in the 1972 Speedway World Pairs Championship, and Jan II was started in 1986 and 1989 Under-21 World Championship.

Career details

World Championships 
 Individual U-21 World Championship (Under-21 World Championship)
 2009 - 17th placed in the Semi-Final One as a track reserve
 2010 - qualify to the Semi-Final One as a track reserve
 Team Under-21 World Championship (Under-21 Speedway World Cup)
 2009 -  Gorzów Wielkopolski - 4th placed (1 pt)
 2010 - 3rd placed in the Qualifying Round One

European Championships 
 Individual Under-19 European Championship
 2008 - 9th placed in the Semi-Final One
 2009 - 8th placed in the Semi-Final One
 2010 -  Goričan - 12th placed (4 pts)
 Team Under-19 European Championship
 2009 -  Holsted - 4th placed (2 pts)
 2010 -  Divišov - 3rd placed (7 pts)

Domestic competitions 

Note: II - Second League (third and last division)

See also 
 Czech Republic national under-21 speedway team (U19)

References

External links 
 (Polish) Jan Holub' articles at SportoweFakty.pl

1991 births
Living people
Czech speedway riders